Lilas (also Romanized as Līlās, Lailās, and Leylās; also known as Līlān and Leylān) is a village in Solgi Rural District, Khezel District, Nahavand County, Hamadan Province, Iran. At the 2006 census, its population was 358, in 101 families.

References 

Populated places in Nahavand County